Jintian is a town in Guiping, Guangxi. It currently has a population of around 9,000. It was the location of the 1851 Jintian uprising, the beginning of the Taiping Rebellion. Jintian is also the name of one of the villages within Jintian Town. The township has a large population of Hakka people.

References

Towns of Guangxi
Guiping